The doubles luge at the 2002 Winter Olympics took place on 15 February at Utah Olympic Park.

Results
Two runs were held on 15 February and the final placements were determined by the combined total of both runs.

References

External links
2002 luge doubles results

Luge at the 2002 Winter Olympics
Men's events at the 2002 Winter Olympics